Mustafa Samican Keskin (born 14 August 1993) is a Turkish footballer who plays for TFF Third League club Orduspor 1967.

References

1993 births
People from Seyhan
Living people
Turkish footballers
Association football midfielders
Adanaspor footballers
Eyüpspor footballers
Gaziantep F.K. footballers
Manisa FK footballers
Boluspor footballers
Şanlıurfaspor footballers
Karşıyaka S.K. footballers
Süper Lig players
TFF First League players
TFF Second League players
TFF Third League players